Generation Um... is a 2012 independent drama film about "a New York City family of circumstance" written and directed by Mark L Mann, and starring Keanu Reeves, Adelaide Clemens and Bojana Novakovic. The film was released theatrically in New York City and Los Angeles on May 3, 2013, moving quickly to VOD and DVD.

Plot
Generation Um... is an existential day-in-the-life portrait that immerses the viewer in the downtown mindsets of John Wall (Keanu Reeves), a lost soul who's been circling the New York City drain for too long, and the two party girls he spends his birthday with Violet (Bojana Novakovic) and Mia (Adelaide Clemens) as they look for light in the darker aspects of their "family of circumstance" and the paths their self-destructive lives have taken.

Cast
Keanu Reeves as John Wall
Adelaide Clemens as Mia
Bojana Novakovic as Violet
Daniel Sunjata as Charles
Sarita Choudhury as Lily, the waitress
Jonny Orsini as Rick
Jake Hoffman as Rob, the wine store guy
Karen Olivo as Carrie Hines, the bartender
Ashley Austin Morris, as girl date
Ruby Lynn Reyner as Posse Queen

Reception
On review aggregator Rotten Tomatoes, the film holds an approval rating of 0% based on 15 reviews, with an average rating of 3.2/10. On Metacritic, the film has a weighted average score of 25 out of 100, based on 10 critics, indicating "generally unfavorable reviews".

Justin Chang of Variety called it "a slapped-together sub-mumblecore exercise that at times suggests a feature-length expansion of 2010′s 'Sad Keanu' meme." Stephen Holden of The New York Times wrote in his review, "Just because the characters waste their time doesn’t mean you should waste yours watching them circle the drain."

References

External links
 

2012 films
2012 drama films
Films set in New York City
Films shot in New York City
Voltage Pictures films
2010s English-language films